153rd Brigade may refer to:

 153rd Mixed Brigade (Spain)
 153rd Infantry Brigade (United Kingdom)
 153rd Cavalry Brigade (United States)

See also

 153rd Division (disambiguation)
 153rd Regiment (disambiguation)